Marsillargues (Provençal: Marsilhargues) is a commune in the Hérault department in southern France.

Its inhabitants are called Marsillarguois.

Geography
The city is situated on the Vidourle river, at mid distance of Montpellier and Nîmes. The commune lies on a vast plain, quite marshy in the south part, which is called Petite Camargue. The closest towns to Marsillargues are Lunel, Aimargues and Saint-Laurent-d'Aigouze.

Climate
Marsillargues has a mediterranean climate (Köppen climate classification Csa).

Population

Sights

Guillaume de Nogaret's Castle
The castle was founded in 1305 by Guillaume de Nogaret, who became Lord of Marsillargues, in reward of his services returned to Philip IV, King of France. From the feudal castle, only the basements, the large kitchens and the keep with its square tower remain.

Saint-Sauveur Church
The church was built in 1688 by Jacques Cubissol, and houses a remarkable oil painting on canvas "La Nativité" attributed to French painter Charles Errard.

Protestant Temple
A Temple was first built between 1574 and 1582. During the tragic period of the French Wars of Religion, it was damaged and then repaired in 1599, only to be totally destroyed in 1685 following the revocation of the Edict of Nantes. The Concordat of 1801 allowed a Protestant minister to be installed at Marsillargues in 1803. Ground was broken for a new Temple in 1806, and it was finished in 1818.

Personalities
 Jacques Antoine Mourgues, French Interior Minister in 1792, was born in Marsillargues in 1734.
 Paulin Etienne d'Anglas de Praviel, was born in Marsillargues in 1793: The French lieutenant known as the last marooned man of the shipwreck of the French frigate "Medusa".
 Apollon, born Louis Uni (1862–1928) was a French strongman native from Marsillargues.
 Gaston Defferre (1910–1986), French Interior Minister (1981–1984), and Mayor of Marseille (1944–1945, 1953–1986) was born in Marsillargues in 1910.

See also
Communes of the Hérault department

References

External links

Official site

Communes of Hérault